Eutelesia is a genus of moths in the subfamily Arctiinae. The genus was erected by George Hampson in 1900.

Species
 Eutelesia phaeochroa
 Eutelesia variegata
 Eutelesia vulgaris

References

External links

Lithosiini
Moth genera